Phrynobatrachus annulatus is a species of frog in the family Phrynobatrachidae.
It is found in Ivory Coast, Ghana, Guinea, and Liberia.
Its natural habitat is subtropical or tropical moist lowland forest.
It is threatened by habitat loss.

References

annulatus
Amphibians described in 1966
Taxonomy articles created by Polbot